= 5th GMA Dove Awards =

1973 US music awards ceremony

- Date: 1973
- Location: Nashville, Tennessee

The 5th Annual GMA Dove Awards were held on 1973 recognizing accomplishments of musicians for the year 1972. The show was held in Nashville, Tennessee.
